Moses Galante may refer to:
Moses Galante (the Elder), died 1608
Moses Galante (the Younger), died 1689
Moses Galante, died 1806